Malmö FF competed in Allsvenskan, Svenska Cupen, qualification for The UEFA Champions League and The UEFA Cup for the 2005 season.

Players

Squad stats

|}

Competitions

Allsvenskan

League table

Matches

Svenska Cupen

UEFA Champions League

Qualifying phase

Second qualifying round

Third qualifying round

Club

Kit

|
|

Other information

References
 

Malmö FF seasons
Malmo FF